Marquay is the name of two communes in France:
 Marquay, Dordogne
 Marquay, Pas-de-Calais